Cyanopepla xenodice is a moth of the subfamily Arctiinae. It was described by Herbert Druce in 1884. It is found in Costa Rica.

References

Cyanopepla
Moths described in 1884